The 2013 USC Trojans football team represented the University of Southern California in the 2013 NCAA Division I FBS college football season. They played their home games at Los Angeles Memorial Coliseum, and were members of the South Division of the Pac-12 Conference. They finished the season 10–4, 6–3 in Pac-12 play to finish in a tie for second place in the South Division. They were invited to the Las Vegas Bowl where they defeated Fresno State.

Head coach Lane Kiffin, who was in his fourth year, was fired on September 29 after a 3–2 start to the season. He was replaced by interim head coach Ed Orgeron. At the end of the regular season, Washington head coach Steve Sarkisian was hired as the new head coach beginning in 2014. This prompted Orgeron to resign before the bowl game. Clay Helton led the Trojans in the Las Vegas Bowl.

Personnel

Coaching staff

Lane Kiffin started the season as the Trojans' head coach, but was fired on September 29 after a 3–2 start. Ed Orgeron became the interim head coach, and went 6–2. He resigned on December 3 after it was announced that Steve Sarkisian was hired to be the permanent head coach.

Depth chart

Recruiting class

Schedule

Game summaries

Hawaii
Sources:

Washington State

1st quarter scoring: None

2nd quarter scoring: USC – Cody Kessler 4-yard run (Andre Heidari kick); WSU – Damante Horton 70-yard interception return (Andrew Furney kick)

3rd quarter scoring: None

4th quarter scoring: WSU – Furney 41-yard field goal

Boston College

Utah State

Arizona State

Head Coach Lane Kiffin was fired after this game upon returning to Los Angeles with the team on September 29, 2013

Arizona

Interim head coach Ed Orgeron takes over the program for USC.

Notre Dame

1st quarter scoring: USC – Silas Redd 1-yard run (Andre Heidari kick); ND – Troy Niklas 7-yard pass from Tommy Rees (Kyle Brindza kick)

2nd quarter scoring: USC – Heidari 22-yard field goal; ND – TJ Jones 11-yard pass from Rees (Brindza kick)

Utah

1st quarter scoring: UTAH – Andy Phillips 42-yard field goal; USC –  Nelson Agholor 30-yard pass from Cody Kessler (Andre Heidari kick)

2nd quarter scoring: USC – Heidari 35-yard field goal; USC – Heidari 38-yard field goal; USC – Heidari 28-yard field goal

3rd quarter scoring: USC – Heidari 40-yard field goal

4th quarter scoring: None

Oregon State

California

1st quarter scoring: USC – Nelson Agholor 75-yard punt return (Andre Heidari kick); USC – Silas Redd 12-yard pass from Cody Kessler (Heidari kick); USC – Javorius Allen 43-yard run (Heidari kick)

2nd quarter scoring: CAL – Kenny Lawler 4-yard pass from Jared Goff (Vincen D'Amato kick); CAL – Darius Powe 24-yard pass from Goff (D'Amato kick); USC – Allen 57-yard pass from Kessler (Heidari kick); USC – Josh Shaw 14-yard punt return (Heidari kick); USC – Agholor 93-yard punt return (kick missed)

3rd quarter scoring: USC – Allen 79-yard run (Heidari kick); USC – Ty Isaac 4-yard run (Heidari kick); CAL – Khalfani Muhammad 7-yard run (D'Amato kick)

4th quarter scoring: USC – Isaac 37-yard run (Heidari kick); CAL – Lawler 4-yard pass from Goff (D'Amato kick)

Stanford

1st quarter scoring: USC – Soma Vainuku 1-yard pass from Cody Kessler (Andre Heidari kick failed); STAN – T. Gaffney 35-yard run (C. Ukropina kick); USC – Javorius Allen 1-yard run (Marqise  Lee pass from Kessler)

2nd quarter scoring: USC – Heidari 23-yard field goal;  STAN – Ukropina 27-yard field goal

3rd quarter scoring: STAN – Gaffney 18-yard run (Ukropina kick)

4th quarter scoring: USC – Heidari 47-yard field goal

Colorado

UCLA

Last season, the Bruins defeated the Trojans 38–28 in the Rose Bowl.

1st quarter scoring: UCLA – Myles Jack 3-yard run (Ka'imi Fairbairn kick)

2nd quarter scoring: UCLA – Eddie Vanderdoes 1-yard run (Fairbairn kick); USC – Javorius Allen 11-yard run (Andre Heidari kick)

3rd quarter scoring: UCLA – Brett Hundley 12-yard run (Fairbairn kick); USC – Xavier Grimble 22-yard pass from Cody Kessler (Heidari kick); UCLA – Hundley 5-yard run (Fairbairn kick)

4th quarter scoring: UCLA – Paul Perkins 8-yard run (Fairbairn kick)

Fresno State (Las Vegas Bowl)

Tracy Jones of the American Athletic Conference is the referee.

1st quarter scoring: USC – Marqise Lee 10-yard pass from Cody Kessler (Andre Heidari kick); FS – Isaiah Burse 8-yard pass from Derek Carr (Colin McGuire kick blocked); USC – Nelson  Agholor 40-yard pass from Kessler (Heidari kick)

2nd quarter scoring: USC – Agholor 17-yard pass from Kessler (Heidari kick); USC – Javorius Allen 24-yard run (Heidari kick); USC – Lee 40-yard pass from Kessler (Heidari kick)

3rd quarter scoring: FS – Davante Adams 23-yard pass from Carr (McGuire kick); USC – Heidari 39-yard field goal

4th quarter scoring: FS – Derron Smith 41-yard interception return (McGuire kick) ; USC – Allen 1-yard run (Heidari kick)

Rankings

Statistics

Scores by quarter (Pac-12 opponents)

Notes
 December 21, 2013 – After winning the Las Vegas Bowl game, USC announced that Clay Helton will return next season.

References

USC
USC Trojans football seasons
Las Vegas Bowl champion seasons
USC Trojans football